Ruth Sara Feldstein is an American historian with research interests in United States history; her work focuses on 20th-century culture and politics; women's and gender history; and African American history. Currently she is professor of history and  American studies at Rutgers University.

Education 
B.A. in Arts (1986) from the University of Pennsylvania (magna cum laude). M.A. in History (1989) from Brown University. Ph.D. in History (1996) from Brown.

Work
In her book  Motherhood in Black and White: Race and Sex in American Liberalism, 1930-1965 (Cornell, 2000) she traces the history of liberalism  between the eras of the New Deal and Great Society, and argues that central to its development were conservative gender ideologies, which perpetuated the stereotypes of bad mothering by domineering "black matriarchs" and bad white "moms".

Her article about Nina Simone  earned her the Letitia Woods Brown Memorial Prize, Best Article on Black Women’s History.

Her book  How It Feels to Be Free: Black Women Entertainers and the Civil Rights Movement (2013), in which she explores the influence of women entertainers (Lena Horne, Miriam Makeba, Nina Simone, Abbey Lincoln, Diahann Carroll, Cicely Tyson) on the civil rights and feminist movements, won the Benjamin Hooks National Book Award and the International Association for Media History's Michael Nelson Prize.

References

Year of birth missing (living people)
Living people
21st-century American historians
Rutgers University faculty
University of Pennsylvania alumni
Brown University alumni